K. P. A. Majeed (born 15 July 1950) is an Indian politician and social worker who currently serves as the Member of the Legislative Assembly from Tirurangadi Constituency in Kerala. He formerly functioned as the General Secretary, Kerala State Committee, Indian Union Muslim League.

Majeed served as the Member of the Legislative Assembly from Mankada Constituency between 1980 and 2021.  He also served as Kerala Government Chief Whip between 1992 and 1996. He unsuccessfully ran for the Parliament (Loksabha) in the 2004 General Elections from Manjeri Constituency.

References

Malayali politicians
People from Malappuram district
Indian Union Muslim League politicians
Kerala MLAs 1980–1982
Kerala MLAs 1982–1987
Kerala MLAs 1987–1991
Kerala MLAs 1991–1996
Kerala MLAs 1996–2001
1950 births
Living people